Oz is a comic book series published by Ralph Griffth (plotter), Stuart Kerr (scripter), and Bill Bryan, an artist. The series was begun by Caliber Comics. It ran for 20 issues, six specials, and two three-issue limited series detailing the romance of the Scarecrow and Scraps, the Patchwork Girl, who created a child using the Powder of Life, in spite of Scraps's discomfort with the Scarecrow's new personality. Jack Pumpkinhead was possessed and destroyed in the Daemonstorm company-wide crossover. After 20 issues, the series was revived by Arrow Comics as Dark Oz for five issues, climaxing the story arc. Nine issues followed titled The Land of Oz, which presented a more orthodox vision of Oz, which was also shown in Oz issue #0.

Plot
Beginning with a tribute to the original story, L. Frank Baum's The Wonderful Wizard of Oz, the tale begins with three 1990s era characters, Peter, Mary and Kevin with his dog Max, being swept away from Earth to the land of Oz via tornado. There they discover that sinister forces have been at work, and the evil Nome King now rules the land, backed up by his army of rock-dwelling minions. Having become unwilling freedom fighters in a world not their own, they soon play a central role in ridding the once-beautiful Oz of the Nome King’s dark influence.

The trio are first separated in a battle with Nomes meanwhile Mary is saved by the stick figure Jack Pumpkinhead. She then meets the Sawhorse, Amber Ombi (Ombi Ambi's nephew), General Jinjur, Hektor Hammerhead and the Wogglebug: the Freedom Fighters of Oz. Kevin and Peter barely escape from a Kalidah, a creature half tiger and half bear. Many adventures occur before the three Earthlings are reunited. They must face Witch Mombi and her Ladies Auxiliary Brigade, an army of enslaved Winged Monkeys, and giant spiders in a cavern. They must also find a way to defeat the Three Evil Kings of Oz: the Scarecrow, the Tin Woodsman, and the Lion, as well as defeat the Nome King and all his magical devices and save Queen Ozma to return Oz to its former glory. 

The three rulers were restored by issue #10. In issue #14, Princess Ozma, who has been under a spell keeping her in a near-vegetative state on the queen's throne next to Ruggedo, is restored and the Wizard found. A new artist took over with issue #16, though Bryan was back with Arrow—he had been drawing the prequel comics. The remainder of the run of Oz climaxes in Dark Oz, though Ruggedo remains as a villain in The Land of Oz.

Dark Oz was optioned for a movie trilogy in 2008. The movie is in development with Pearry Reginald Teo attached to direct.

See also
 Oz Squad

External links
 Bill Bryan interview

Comics based on Oz (franchise)
Caliber Comics titles